Open Heaven / River Wild (stylised as OPEN HEAVEN / River Wild) is the 24th live album of Hillsong Worship, which consists of several worship pastors from Australian church Hillsong Church. The album was recorded during the 2015 Hillsong Conference at the Sydney SuperDome (currently named the Qudos Bank Arena) from 29 June until 3 July 2015 and was released on 16 October 2015, under Hillsong Music, Sparrow Records and Capitol Christian Music Group; this marks the first time the church's annual worship album was recorded entirely during the conference, as opposed to the annual July releases that coincide with the event. Michael Guy Chislett oversaw production of the album, while Hillsong senior pastor Brian Houston and his son, worship leader Joel Houston, served as executive producers.

Open Heaven / River Wild features several prominent vocalists of Hillsong, including Reuben Morgan, Joel Houston and Marty Sampson, as well as the Hillsong United band and the Hillsong Young & Free group. Following the Easter release of "O Praise the Name (Anástasis)", the album's lead single, "One Thing", was released on 18 September 2015.

Background 
In March 2015, "O Praise the Name (Anástasis)" was released as a free download on Hillsong's website, and served as a single for Easter. David Ware served as vocalist for "O Praise the Name", while prominent worship leader Marty Sampson co-wrote the song. Sampson played the song for Hillsong global creative director Cass Langton, who was "overwhelmed" by the song, saying, "The lyrics… they captivated me. The thoughts in the song opened my eyes again to the Gospel story, and I felt the emotions of the death and resurrection of Jesus Christ all over again — I could hardly wait to hear our church worship to this song."

On 14 June 2015, Langton announced through a blog post that the recording of the next annual live worship album will be at the 2015 Hillsong Conference at the Allphones Arena in Sydney, Australia, marking the first time the album would be recorded entirely during the conference, as opposed to the typical July releases that coincide with the event.

On 17 August 2015, Hillsong released a teaser video on various social media accounts; the title of the album as well as the cover art and the 16 October release date were announced the next day. On 3 September 2015 Hillsong released the trailer to YouTube along with the track-listing for the new album.

Recording 

The live worship album and DVD were recorded during the span of the 2015 Hillsong Conference in Sydney, Australia from 29 June to 3 July.

Worship leaders from several Hillsong Church locations, such as Aryel Murphy from Hillsong Los Angeles, Chris Davenport from Hillsong New York, Tarryn Stokes from Hillsong Melbourne and Reuben Morgan from Hillsong London, were included in the recording.

Promotion

Singles 
"One Thing" was released on 18 September 2015 via iTunes as a pre-order single.

"O Praise the Name (Anastásis)" was released on 2 October 2015 via iTunes as a pre-order single.

Critical reception 

Barry Westman, rating the album five stars for Worship Leader, says, "this collection of songs will provide the church with a fresh batch of songs for corporate worship with a heartfelt and intimate feel." Awarding the album four stars at New Release Today, Kevin Davis states, "These are very passionate worship songs sung with vocal sincerity and reverence with biblically based lyrics." Madeleine Dittmer, giving the album four and a half stars from The Christian Beat, writes, "The twelve tracks on this album are beautifully written songs of praise that draw listeners in to a sacred place of worship." Indicating in a 75-percent review at Jesus Wired, Rebekah Joy describes, "[the album] really provides some good anthems of worship that really fit in with the Hillsong brand."

Track listing

Personnel

 David Andrew – keyboards
 Michael Guy Chislett – electric guitar
 Matt Crocker – lead vocals, worship leader, acoustic guitar
 Adam Crosariol – bass guitar
 Chris Davenport – lead vocals, worship leader, acoustic guitar
 Jonathon "JD" Douglass – lead vocals, worship leader
 Tyler Douglass – additional vocals
 Katie Dodson – lead vocals, worship leader
 Ben Fielding – lead vocals, worship leader, acoustic guitar
 Annie Garratt – lead vocals, worship leader
 Taya Gaukrodger – lead vocals, worship leader
 Jad Gillies – lead vocals, worship leader, acoustic and electric guitar
 Autumn Hardman – keyboards
 Matt Hann – bass guitar
 Nigel Hendroff – acoustic guitar, electric guitar
 Hannah Hobbs – lead vocals, worship leader
 Joel Houston – lead vocals, worship leader, acoustic guitar
 Alexander Epa Iosefa – additional vocals
 Aodhan King – lead vocals, worship leader
 Peter James – keyboards
 Simon Kobler – drums
 Daniel McMurray – drums
 Reuben Morgan – lead vocals, worship leader, acoustic guitar
 Jihea Oh – bass guitar
 Alexander Pappas – additional vocals
 Marty Sampson – lead vocals, worship leader, acoustic guitar
 Renee Sieff – additional vocals
 Tarryn Stokes – lead vocals, worship leader
 Aryel Temu – lead vocals, worship leader
 Benjamin Tennikoff – keyboards
 Dylan Thomas – electric guitar
 Laura Toggs – lead vocals, worship leader
 Melodie Wagner – additional vocals
 David Ware – lead vocals, worship leader
 Harrison Wood – drums

Charts

References 

Hillsong Music live albums
2015 live albums